Arqin (also Romanized as Arqīn; also known as Arghīn and Arkin) is a village in Aq Bolagh Rural District of Sojas Rud District of Khodabandeh County, Zanjan province, Iran. At the 2006 National Census, its population was 936 in 209 households. The following census in 2011 counted 1,088 people in 308 households. The latest census in 2016 showed a population of 1,110 people in 332 households; it was the largest village in its rural district.

References 

Khodabandeh County

Populated places in Zanjan Province

Populated places in Khodabandeh County